"Birthday Song" is a song by American rapper 2 Chainz, released July 24, 2012 as the second single from his debut studio album Based on a T.R.U. Story (2012). The song, which features fellow American rapper Kanye West, was produced by Sonny Digital, West and BWheezy, with additional production by Anthony Kilhoffer, Lifted and Mike Dean. The hip hop song is about the rapper's yearning for women with large buttocks.

Music video
The music video, released on August 30, 2012, was directed by Andreas Nilsson.

Live performances 
On October 9, 2012, 2 Chainz performed the song along with "I'm Different" at the 2012 BET Hip Hop Awards.  He also performed the song along with "I'm Different" on Jimmy Kimmel Live.

Chart performance
"Birthday Song" debuted at number 91 on the US Billboard Hot 100 on the week of August 11, 2012. The song fell off the chart the following week. It re-entered the chart at number 100 on the week of September 1, 2012. The song continued to climb the chart, until reached its peak position at number 47 on the week of November 10, 2012. The single ended up spending a total of 20 weeks on the chart. On November 25, 2014, the single was certified double platinum by the Recording Industry Association of America (RIAA) for sales of over two million digital copies in the United States.

Charts

Weekly charts

Year-end charts

Certifications

Release history

References

Songs about birthdays
2012 singles
2012 songs
2 Chainz songs
Kanye West songs
Def Jam Recordings singles
Songs written by 2 Chainz
Songs written by Kanye West
Song recordings produced by Kanye West
Song recordings produced by Mike Dean (record producer)
Music videos directed by Andreas Nilsson
Songs written by Sonny Digital